Alessio Pasquale Viola (born 26 December 1990) is an Italian professional footballer who plays as a striker.

Career
Viola made his Serie A debut for Reggina on 31 May 2009 in a game against Siena when he came on as a substitute in the 69th minute for his older brother Benito Nicolas Viola.

On 25 January 2011, he returned to Reggina from loan.

In 2013, he left for AlbinoLeffe. On 31 January 2014, he was signed by Frosinone, with Salvatore Aurelio moved to AlbinoLeffe.

On 23 July 2015, he joined Foggia for free.

He returned to his first club Reggina on 7 August 2018, signing a two-year contract. On 19 April 2019, his contract was dissolved by mutual consent following a knee surgery several days earlier.

References

External links
 
 

1990 births
Living people
Italian footballers
Serie A players
Serie B players
Serie C players
Reggina 1914 players
A.C. Monza players
A.C. Carpi players
U.C. AlbinoLeffe players
Frosinone Calcio players
Association football forwards
Virtus Francavilla Calcio players
Footballers from Calabria
Sportspeople from the Metropolitan City of Reggio Calabria